Saturday Night Live (SNL) is a late-night sketch comedy and variety show created by Lorne Michaels. It premiered on NBC on October 11, 1975, under the title NBC's Saturday Night. The show usually satirizes contemporary American popular culture and politics. SNL features a two-tiered cast: the repertory members, also known as the "Not Ready for Prime-Time Players", and newer cast members, known as "Featured Players." A typical episode of SNL will feature a single host, who delivers the opening monologue and performs in sketches with the cast.  While the format also features a musical guest, and a number of episodes have featured celebrity cameos, the focus of the show is the guest host.

George Carlin was the first to host the show, while Candice Bergen was the first woman to do so. Guests that host five times (or more) are considered "members" of the Five-Timers Club, introduced on the December 8, 1990, episode, when Tom Hanks became the seventh person to host their fifth episode. There have been 44 episodes on which the show's host also served as the musical guest, with the first being Paul Simon on October 18, 1975. The most recent to pull double duty was Jack Harlow on October 29, 2022. The Rolling Stones are the only band to ever serve as both host and musical guest during the same episode, which aired October 7, 1978.

List of Saturday Night Live hosts

Saturday Night Live has featured a wide array of hosts and musical guests. George Carlin served as the show's first host in October 1975; three episodes later, Candice Bergen became the first female host and the first to host more than once. Actor Alec Baldwin holds the record for most times hosting, having done so seventeen times since 1990; Baldwin took the record from actor Steve Martin who has hosted sixteen times since 1976. 

Several former cast members have returned to take on hosting duties. Original cast member Chevy Chase has hosted the most times, eight in total. Tina Fey follows behind, having hosted six times, while Bill Murray and Will Ferrell have hosted five times. On December 11, 1982, Eddie Murphy became the only person to host while still a member of the cast, filling the role at the last minute when the scheduled host (his 48 Hours co-star Nick Nolte) became ill.

Musical guests can be solo acts or bands, who perform two to three musical numbers. Occasionally, the musical guest has also simultaneously served as the host. Paul Simon was the first example, hosting and performing on the second episode on October 18, 1975. As of November 7, 2020, Dave Grohl is the most frequent musical guest, performing on fourteen shows since 1992.

In 1982, at age 7, Drew Barrymore became the youngest person to host the show. Betty White is the oldest person to host, having done so at 88 years of age in 2010. Due to White's advanced age, Tina Fey, Molly Shannon, Maya Rudolph, Rachel Dratch and Amy Poehler were on standby to replace her as host or in sketches if she became fatigued, though White ultimately appeared through the whole show as planned. In 2000, singer Britney Spears became the youngest person to both host and simultaneously serve as the show's musical guest, at 18 years and 161 days old.

In addition to making cameo appearances, political figures have also hosted the show. Donald Trump, who hosted in 2004 (promoting the reality TV show The Apprentice) and again in 2015 as a presidential hopeful, is the only host who eventually became President of the United States. Al Gore hosted in 2002, the only former vice president to do so. Presidential candidates, either former, current, or future, have served as hosts: in addition to Trump and Gore, there was Ralph Nader (1977), Jesse Jackson and George McGovern (both 1984), Steve Forbes (1996), Rudy Giuliani (1997), John McCain (2002), and Al Sharpton (2003). Although not a host, Sarah Palin appeared on SNL in 2008 after weeks of Tina Fey doing impressions of her on the show. In more recent years, Bernie Sanders and Elizabeth Warren have both appeared on the show during their presidential campaigns, in 2016 and 2020, respectively.

Five-Timers Club

The Five-Timers Club is the group of performers who have hosted SNL at least five times. SNLs first mention of the Club occurred on December 8, 1990, when Tom Hanks mentioned that it was his fifth appearance as host in his monologue:

After Hanks delivered his monologue, the show segued to a sketch featuring Hanks, Steve Martin, Elliott Gould, and Paul Simon in the richly appointed private club.

The second time the Five-Timers Club was mentioned was when Danny DeVito was inducted in 1993. The club was mentioned again after the mark was reached by hosts John Goodman (1994), Alec Baldwin (1994), Christopher Walken (2001), Drew Barrymore (2007), Justin Timberlake (2013), Ben Affleck (2013), Scarlett Johansson (2017), Melissa McCarthy (2017), Dwayne Johnson (2017), Jonah Hill (2018), Paul Rudd (2021), John Mulaney (2022), and Woody Harrelson (2023).

Timberlake's fifth appearance as host on March 9, 2013, featured the reappearance of the richly appointed club. The sketch featured Paul Simon, Steve Martin, Chevy Chase, Alec Baldwin, Tom Hanks, and Candice Bergen.  There were portraits of John Goodman and Drew Barrymore in the Five-Timers Club's Hall of Portraits. When Melissa McCarthy hosted the show for the fifth time, Five-Timers Club member Steve Martin appeared in the goodnights to welcome her to the club. When Dwayne Johnson hosted the show for the fifth time, fellow five-timers Baldwin and Tom Hanks appeared in the monologue to welcome him to the club. 

On November 3, 2018, the club is seen again as part of the monologue of actor/director Jonah Hill. He is taken there by Five-Timer Tina Fey. Once in, he is greeted by Candice Bergen, and Drew Barrymore. Seeing no men in the club, Hill wonders if it's "Ladies Night". He is told by Fey that the other men "are not allowed in right now" because of presumed harassment problems.

The club has been spoofed by SNL itself. During her fourth appearance as host in April 2019, Emma Stone anticipated "Four-Timers Club" honors in her monologue.

The club was seen again on February 26, 2022, when John Mulaney hosted for the fifth time. In the sketch, Mulaney is greeted by Steve Martin, Candice Bergen, and Tina Fey. Paul Rudd was the last person to host for the fifth time, although his show was affected due to the rise of Omicron cases, which resulted in a reduced cast and no audience. The sketch also featured an appearance by Elliott Gould, which was his first appearance in 15 years on the show, along with a surprise appearance from Conan O'Brien, who appeared in the first Five Timers club sketch as a doorman when Tom Hanks hosted for his fifth time back in season 16. 

Chevy Chase was the first former SNL cast member to both host the show and join the Five-Timers Club. This was subsequently done by Bill Murray, Tina Fey, and Will Ferrell.

The club was referenced by Fox Sports writer Peter Schrager as his basis for the "Favre Backup Club", a rundown of notable names who have held the spot behind NFL quarterback Brett Favre on the depth chart.

The following people are members of the Five-Timers Club:
Simon has hosted only four times but has been included in multiple Five-Timers Club sketches because of his many other appearances as either a musical or special guest.

See also
 List of Saturday Night Live cast members
 List of Saturday Night Live writers
 List of Saturday Night Live episodes

References

Bibliography
 

Guests